Rashid Abdullahi Mohamed is a Somali politician. He is the former governor of the Bay region of Somalia.
He was the former Minister of Defence of Somalia. On 29 March 2017, the Prime Minister's cabinet nominations were approved by parliament.

References

External link 

Ethnic Somali people
Defence Ministers of Somalia
Government ministers of Somalia
Living people
Year of birth missing (living people)